Niganiawas is a village situated in Rewari district, India.

Demographics
As of 2011 India census, Niganiawas had a population of 859 in 475 households. Males (444) constitute 51.68%  of the population and females (415) 48.31%. Niganiawas has an average literacy(596) rate of 69.38%, lower than the national average of 74%: male literacy(350) is 58.72%, and female literacy(246) is 41.27% of total literates (596). In Niganiawas, 12.22% of the population is under 6 years of age (105).

Adjacent villages
Masani
Rasgan
Dungarwas
Hansaka
jonawas 
Nikhri
Kanhawas
Salhawas
Ashiaki
Majra Gurdas

References 

Villages in Rewari district